Dmitry Solovyov (born 28 December 1963) is a Uzbekistani judoka. He competed in the men's half-heavyweight event at the 1996 Summer Olympics.

References

1963 births
Living people
Uzbekistani male judoka
Olympic judoka of Uzbekistan
Judoka at the 1996 Summer Olympics
Place of birth missing (living people)
Asian Games medalists in judo
Judoka at the 1994 Asian Games
Asian Games bronze medalists for Uzbekistan
Medalists at the 1994 Asian Games
20th-century Uzbekistani people
21st-century Uzbekistani people